Futalaufquen Lake (Lago Futalaufquen) is a large lake in Chubut Province, Argentina.   Futalaufquen Lake is in the chain of lakes of the Futaleufú River system of Argentina which via Yelcho Lake and the Yelcho River flows into the Pacific Ocean in Chile. Located in the Andes, Lake Futalaufquen is three-lobed, of glacial origin, and occupies narrow valleys between glaciated peaks. It is located in the Andes within Los Alerces National Park. The name comes from the Mapuche language.  "Futa" means great, and "laufquen" means lake.

A highway runs along the eastern arm of the lake. Tourist facilities and the National Park headquarters and Futalaufquen village are there.  Fishing for trout is popular in the lake.

Description

The Arrayanes River is named after the trees of the same name found along its banks (the Arrayanes tree is commonly called the Chilean Myrtle in English). The Arrayanes River is noted for its scenery and sport fishing, especially for rainbow trout, an introduced species.

The outlet for Futalaufquen Lake is the western arm.  The lake flows through a narrow passage called the "Monster Narrows" (estrecho de los monstruos) into Kruger Lake,  in size. The Narrows acquired that name because of the large trout that can be seen in the crystal-clear water. The outflow from Kruger Lake is called the Frey River which flows into Amutui Quimey Reservoir, the next large lake in the chain.

Sources

Lakes of Chubut Province
Patagonia
Lakes of Argentina